Joseph Thomas Daley (December 21, 1915 – September 2, 1983) was an American prelate of the Roman Catholic Church. He served as bishop of the Diocese of Harrisburg in Pennsylvania from 1971 until his death in 1983.

Biography

Early life 
Joseph Daley was born on December 21, 1915, in Connerton, Schuylkill County, Pennsylvania.  He studied at St. Charles Borromeo Seminary in Philadelphia. Daley was ordained to the priesthood by Cardinal Dennis Dougherty on June 7, 1941.

Auxiliary Bishop, Coadjutor Bishop and Bishop of Harrisburg 
On November 25, 1963, Daley was appointed as an auxiliary bishop of the Diocese of Harrisburg and Titular Bishop of Barca by Pope Paul VI. He received his episcopal consecration on January 7, 1964, from Archbishop John Krol, with Bishops George L. Leech and Gerald McDevitt serving as co-consecrators. Daley was named coadjutor bishop of Harrisburg on July 31, 1967 by Paul VI, and succeeded Bishop Leech as the sixth bishop of Harrisburg on October 19, 1971. 

During his 12-year-long tenure, Daley established the Diocesan Office of Planning, Diocesan Development Office, and Emmaus Program for priests. He called for a temporary moratorium on building nuclear power plants after the accident at the Three Mile Island Nuclear Generating Station near Harrisburg in 1979.

Death and legacy 
Joseph Dale died in Harrisburg from cancer on September 2, 1983 at age 67.  On August 1, 2018, Bishop Ronald Gainer, Daley's successor as bishop of Harrisburg, announced that the names of every bishop of Harrisburg from 1947 onward – including Daley's – would be removed from any building or room in the diocese named in their honor, due to their failure to protect victims from abuse.

References

1915 births
1983 deaths
St. Charles Borromeo Seminary alumni
People from Schuylkill County, Pennsylvania
Roman Catholic bishops of Harrisburg
20th-century Roman Catholic bishops in the United States
Participants in the Second Vatican Council